Jennie Chua Kheng Yeng is a Singaporean businesswoman who is the co-founder of Beeworks, Inc. She was named one of Forbes Asia's "50 Women In the Mix" in 2013. She has been called "Singapore's Grande Dame".

Early life and education
Jennie Chua was born in Batam, Indonesia and raised in the Tanglin area of Singapore. She is the oldest of 12 children. Her father, Chua Kok Kuan, was a wealthy businessman who sold cloves and nutmeg, but lost his business when she was 10. 

Chua was educated at Singapore Chinese Girls' School and started working as a teenager, as a typist and tutor. After completing her A Level at Anglo-Chinese School, she was awarded a scholarship to attend the University of Singapore (now the National University of Singapore), where she dropped out after a year. After school, she worked as a teacher.

Personal life
She met Goh Kian Chee, son of Goh Keng Swee, when she was 16. The couple married eight years later in 1968. As Goh attended Cornell University, Chua moved there and attended Cornell for hotel management. They couple have two children, but divorced in 1977 and remained on amicable terms.

Career
After graduation, Chua started working as a general manager at the Mandarin Hotel in Singapore. In 1977, she started working, for 11 years, at the Singapore Tourism Board (STB), as director. In 1988, she started working for Westin Hotels as a marketing director. 

Chua became the first female general manager at Raffles Hotel in 1990. In 2003, she became the chief executive officer of Raffles Holdings but left Raffles Holdings in 2007. She became the chief executive officer of Ascott Group, a department of CapitaLand, she subsequently became the chief corporate officer for CapitaLand. She left the company in July 2012. 

Chua is the co-founder of Beeworks. Today, she is 40% of the company's shares. Her work is currently focused on the fast food market in Singapore.

She is a former teacher at the Asian Institute of Tourism in the Philippines. Chua is also Singapore's Ambassador to Mexico, and former Ambassador to Slovakia.

References

Singaporean women in business
Living people
Singaporean chief executives
Cornell University School of Hotel Administration alumni
Singaporean hoteliers
Ambassadors of Singapore to Slovakia
Ambassadors of Singapore to Mexico
People from the Riau Islands
Singaporean women diplomats
Singaporean  women ambassadors
Year of birth missing (living people)